The music of Dance Dance Revolution SuperNova is composed largely of Konami Originals, in-house music written and performed by Konami staff, including older songs carried over from Dance Dance Revolution Extreme and new songs introduced in the SuperNova series. It also contains several licensed tracks.

Lists of songs

Arcade
The arcade release of SuperNova contains 303 songs, of which 119 are all-new additions to the game. The arcade release of SuperNova 2 contains 357 songs, of which 62 are all-new additions to the game.

Most of the songs featured in SuperNova and SuperNova 2 returned in subsequent arcade releases:
 Dance Dance Revolution X features  97 songs from SuperNova and 61 songs from SuperNova 2.
 Dance Dance Revolution X2 features 82 songs from SuperNova and 50 songs from SuperNova 2.
 Dance Dance Revolution X3 features 81 songs from SuperNova 2.
 Dance Dance Revolution 2013 features 80 songs from SuperNova 2.

PlayStation 2
The PlayStation 2 release of Dance Dance Revolution SuperNova contains 79 songs (5 of them only available online) in North America and 84 songs in Japan, while the PlayStation 2 release of Dancing Stage SuperNova contains 69 songs.

North America

Japan

Europe

See also
List of Dance Dance Revolution songs

References

Dance Dance Revolution soundtracks